Stephen Lawrence Malovic (July 21, 1956 – April 13, 2007) was an American-Israeli basketball player.  He played in the National Basketball Association (NBA) for one season and enjoyed a long career in Israel, where he ultimately obtained Israeli citizenship.

Malovic played college basketball at the University of Southern California and San Diego State University.  He played 39 games in the 1979–80 NBA season for the Washington Bullets, San Diego Clippers and Detroit Pistons.  Following that season, Malovic played in Italy and Spain, finally settling into the Israeli top league.  He played until 1996 for several teams and was a part of an Israeli League championship with Hapoel Galil Elyon in 1993.

Malovic died of a heart attack on April 13, 2007.

References

1956 births
2007 deaths
American expatriate basketball people in Israel
American expatriate basketball people in Italy
American expatriate basketball people in Spain
American men's basketball players
Basketball players from Phoenix, Arizona
Basketball players from Cleveland
Bnei Hertzeliya basketball players
Converts to Judaism from Christianity
Detroit Pistons players
Elitzur Maccabi Netanya B.C. players
Hapoel Galil Elyon players
Israeli Basketball Premier League players
Israeli men's basketball players
Israeli people of American descent
Phoenix Suns draft picks
Power forwards (basketball)
Real Madrid Baloncesto players
San Diego Clippers players
San Diego State Aztecs men's basketball players
USC Trojans men's basketball players
Viola Reggio Calabria players
Washington Bullets players